Cervione Cathedral is a former Roman Catholic cathedral in Cervione on the island of Corsica, and a national monument of France. It was the seat of the Bishop of Aleria until 1801, when all Corsican sees were merged into the Bishopric of Ajaccio.

Sources and external links

 Catholic Encyclopedia: Corsica
Location

Cathedrals in Corsica
Former cathedrals in France
Monuments historiques of Corsica